

Track listing
"Future Legend" (David Bowie)/"Bewitched" (Richard Rodgers) - 1:09
Originally from the David Bowie album Diamond Dogs (1974)
"Diamond Dogs" (Bowie) - 3:52
Originally from the David Bowie album Diamond Dogs (1974)
"It's No Game" (Bowie) - 3:04
Originally from the David Bowie album Scary Monsters (And Super Creeps) (1980)
"The Man Who Sold the World" (Bowie) - 2:43
Originally from the David Bowie album The Man Who Sold the World (1970)
"Look Back in Anger" (Bowie, Brian Eno) - 1:53
Originally from the David Bowie album Lodger (1979)
"We Are the Dead" (Bowie) - 5:53
Originally from the David Bowie album Diamond Dogs (1974)
"Lady Stardust" (Bowie) - 3:14
Originally from the David Bowie album The Rise and Fall of Ziggy Stardust and the Spiders from Mars (1972)
"London Boys" (Bowie) - 2:48
Originally a single by David Bowie (1966)
"Boys Keep Swinging" (Bowie, Eno) - 1:49
Originally from the David Bowie album Lodger (1979)
"The Bewlay Brothers" (Bowie) - 5:07
Originally from the David Bowie album Hunky Dory (1971)
"Be My Wife" (Bowie) - 1:02
Originally from the David Bowie album Low (1977)
"Always Crashing in the Same Car" (Bowie) - 2:30
Originally from the David Bowie album Low (1977)
"Be My Wife (Reprise)" (Bowie) - 0:46
Originally from the David Bowie album Low (1977)
"Life on Mars?" (Bowie) - 3:25
Originally from the David Bowie album Hunky Dory (1971)
"Please Mr Gravedigger" (Bowie) - 3:04
Originally from the David Bowie album David Bowie (1967)
"Station to Station" (Bowie) - 2:50
Originally from the David Bowie album Station to Station (1976)
"All the Madmen" (Bowie) - 3:43
Originally from the David Bowie album The Man Who Sold the World (1970)
"The Buddha of Suburbia" (Bowie) - 3:47
Originally from the David Bowie album The Buddha of Suburbia (1993)
"Heroes" (Bowie, Eno)/"Kopf bis Fuß" (Friedrich Hollander) - 2:35
Originally from the David Bowie album "Heroes" (1977)
"I Have Not Been to Oxford Town" (Bowie, Eno) - 4:38
Originally from the David Bowie album 1. Outside (1995)
"Time" (Bowie) - 5:29
Originally from the David Bowie album Aladdin Sane (1974)
"All the Young Dudes" (Bowie) - 3:26
Originally a single by Mott the Hoople (1972)

Personnel

Musicians
Des de Moor - vocals, guitar, bass guitar, percussion
Russell Churney - vocals, piano, guitar (track 10)
Barb Jungr - vocals (tracks 7, 22)

Other personnel
Richard Lee - recording
Des de Moor - recording
Alan Little - mastering
Theo Cohen - photography
Jo Minton - photography
Total Blam Blam - photography
Robb Johnson - art
Based on the painting De Val van Icarus by Pieter Bruegel
Simon Smith Associates - design

External links
Des de Moor
Official website
Russell Churney biography
Russell Churney section of the Fascinating Aïda website
David Bowie
Official website

2003 albums
David Bowie tribute albums